Nicole Susan Manison (born 1979) is an Australian politician. She has been a Labor Party member of the Northern Territory Legislative Assembly since 2013, representing the electorate of Wanguri. She has been Deputy Chief Minister since the 2016 election, serving under both Michael Gunner and Natasha Fyles. She was also Treasurer from 2016 to 2020.

|}

Manison was born in Tennant Creek, and she later studied journalism and public relations at Curtin University in Perth. Prior to entering politics, she worked as human resources and communications manager for MG Kailis Group and as a media advisor to former Labor leaders Paul Henderson and Delia Lawrie.

She was elected to the Legislative Assembly in the 2013 by-election after the resignation of former Chief Minister Paul Henderson. On 18 February 2013, opposition leader Delia Lawrie appointed Manison to the Labor frontbench in the portfolios of Public Employment and Public Housing. Manison was later promoted to Health, Essential Services, Statehood, Multicultural Affairs, Young Territorians and Senior Territorians portfolios.

Following Labor's victory at the 2016 election, Manison was sworn in as Treasurer of the Northern Territory on 31 August, replacing former Chief Minister Adam Giles. On 11 September, she was selected as the new deputy leader of the Labor Party and Deputy Chief Minister, following the defeat of Lynne Walker at the election. She was also designated as Minister for Infrastructure, Planning and Logistics and Minister for Children.

The aftermath of the 2020 election saw a reshuffle of the ministry. Chief Minister Michael Gunner opted to become his own Treasurer, but retained Manison as his deputy. Manison was sworn into the new cabinet as Minister for Fire, Police and Ambulance Services, Mining and Industry, Northern Australia and Trade, Defence Industries, Agribusiness and Aquaculture, and International Education.

Manison is a member of Labor Right.

References

1979 births
Living people
Deputy Chief Ministers of the Northern Territory
Treasurers of the Northern Territory
Australian Labor Party members of the Northern Territory Legislative Assembly
Members of the Northern Territory Legislative Assembly
Curtin University alumni
21st-century Australian politicians
Women members of the Northern Territory Legislative Assembly
21st-century Australian women politicians